In video games, spawning is the live creation of a character, item or NPC. Respawning is the recreation of an entity after its death or destruction, perhaps after losing one of its lives. Despawning is the deletion of an entity from the game world.

All player characters typically spawn at the start of a round, whereas some objects or mobs may spawn after the occurrence of a particular event or delay. When a player character respawns, they generally do so in an earlier point of the level and get some kind of penalty.

The term was coined by id Software within the context of its game, Doom.

Spawn points
Spawn points are areas in a level where players spawn. In levels designed for team play, these points are usually grouped so that each team spawns in their own tight area of the level. Spawn points are typically reserved for one team at any time and often have the ability to change hands to the other team. Some games even allow spawn points to be created by players; using a beacon for example in Battlefield 2142. "Odd" spawn points cause the player to be spawned as if actively entering the game world, rather than merely appearing there.

Regarding player-created spawn points, the game Enemy Territory: Quake Wars allows players utilizing the Strogg Technician class (Strogg team version of GDF Medic class) to create "spawn hosts" out of the bodies of fallen GDF enemies. Any player on the Strogg team can use any unused spawn host and the player – upon death – can use it to spawn closer to the objective or in a tactical location, being effective tools for defending a location or advancing the front line. The spawn host disappears after the Strogg player respawns at its location, so the spawn host can only be used once. Conversely, players utilizing the GDF Medic class can disable and remove Strogg player-created spawn hosts by zapping them with their defibrillator pads.

Spawn camping is a practice where a player waits near precise spawn points to kill enemies as they spawn. This is usually considered to be poor sportsmanship and some players even perceive it to be exploitative of the game itself. Most team-based games have some kind of protection against spawn camping, such as a one-way door that only allows players to leave the spawn area, permanent AI defences or perhaps a timer which kills enemies if they spend too long around the spawn area. Games with capturable spawn points will often leave some spawn points without this sort of camping protection. Spawn points for game objects are often abused in a similar fashion in game types such as role-playing games.

Enemy respawning
In some games, enemies may be respawned (or, equivalently, new ones spawned) to keep players on their toes and create tension, or force players to move on, making it too costly (in resources) and/or too dangerous to stay in one place for too long. Enemies may visibly spawn or, in more realistic games, spawn outside the player's line of sight and move towards the player. Early games including monster respawning are Joust, Doom and its sequel Doom II: Hell on Earth. The enemies in these games had the ability to spawn from their teammates.

In MMORPGs, it is typical for monsters or mobs of monsters to continually respawn to allow all players a chance to fight. Some of these games implement instances, which create a temporary copy of the game world and its characters, reserved for a subset of players; this allows each subset the chance to experience that part of the game without any interference from uninvited guests.

Player-requested entities
In some games a player who has access to debugging or administrative tools can spawn entities or pickups with said tools.

See also
Camping (video gaming)

References

Esports terminology
MUD terminology
Video game terminology